Shahed Ali is a Bangladeshi actor, works both in films and television. Ali made his acting debut through theatre. His most notable works include Moner Manush, Swapnajaal, Oggatonama, Nabab LLB.

Early life

Works

Television 

 Bishaash (2011)
 Pata Jhorar Din (2018)
 Bra-ther (2018)
 Behind The Puppy (2018)
 Viral Girl (2018)
 Majnu (2018)
 Punorjonmo (2018)
 Mayer Daak (2021)
 Shahoshika (2021)
 Punorjonmo 2 (2021)
 Joint Family (2021)

 Films 

 Web series 
 Mohanagar'' (2021)
 Sadar ghater tiger (2020)

References

External links 
 

Bangladeshi male film actors
Year of birth missing (living people)
Living people
21st-century Bangladeshi male actors